Children of the Snow Land is a 2017 Nepalese English feature documentary film directed by Zara Balfour, and Marcus Stephenson. The film is produced by  Zara Balfour, Marcus Stephenson, and Christopher Hird. The documentary stars Nima Gurung, Sangpo Lama, Tsering Deki Lama, and Jeewan Mahatara in the lead roles. The documentary is about education in Nepal. The film premiered at the Kathmandu International Mountain Film Festival (KIMFF) in 2017. The film has won Best Documentary at the Victoria Film Festival and London Independent Film Festival.

Synopsis 
In remote parts of Nepal parents are sending their children to a school run by Buddhist monks in Kathmandu, capital of Nepal hoping to give them a better life. For about ten or more years the children's do not see their parents nor speak to them. Three students including Nima, Sangpo, and Tsering trek back to Himalayas their parents are waiting for them to be raised on the world of technology. Whilst trekking they film themselves and speak to the camera about their thoughts and feelings. Nima describes how his father dropped him at the school with even saying goodbye which made his heartbreak.

Cast 
Credits adapted from I Will Tell.

 Nima Gurung
 Sangpo Lama
 Tsering Deki Lama
 Jeewan Mahatara

Reception

Critical response 
The film received praise from critics and audiences. Cath Clarke of The Guardian wrote, "You can count the miles. But with enormous sensitivity the film observes the distance these bright, confident city kids have travelled from poverty," giving it a rating of three out of five. Nigel Andrews of Financial Times wrote, "It’s a wonderfully touching documentary", "And almost a proof that everyone has a story — even a film — inside his or her life." Brady Clark of The Upcoming wrote, "...the tragedy of the documentary is equalled with the warmth of family and the optimism of its subjects." and gave the film three stars out of five.

Accolades

References

External links 

 

2017 films
2010s Nepali-language films
Nepalese documentary films
Nepalese coming-of-age films
Documentary films about Nepal
2010s English-language films